Stephan Huygen (born 7 January 1968) is a Belgian short track speed skater. He competed in the men's 500 metres event at the 1994 Winter Olympics.

References

1968 births
Living people
Belgian male short track speed skaters
Olympic short track speed skaters of Belgium
Short track speed skaters at the 1994 Winter Olympics
People from Ekeren